Thomas Percy, 7th Earl of Northumberland, 1st Baron Percy, KG (152822 August 1572), led the Rising of the North and was executed for treason. He was later beatified by the Catholic Church.

Early life

Percy was the eldest son of Sir Thomas Percy and Eleanor, daughter of Sir Guiscard Harbottal. He was the nephew of Henry Percy, 6th Earl of Northumberland, with whom Anne Boleyn had a romantic association before she became the wife of King Henry VIII. When Thomas was eight years old his father, Sir Thomas Percy, was executed at Tyburn (2 June 1537) for having taken a leading part in the Pilgrimage of Grace, and he also is considered a martyr by many. Thomas and his brother Henry were then removed from their mother's keeping and entrusted to Sir Thomas Tempest.

In 1549, when Thomas Percy came of age, an Act was passed "for the restitution in blood of Mr. Thomas Percy". Shortly afterwards he was knighted, and, three years later, in Queen Mary I's reign, he regained his ancestral honours and lands. He was returned as Member of Parliament for Westmorland in the Parliament of England called in November 1554. Declared governor of Prudhoe Castle he besieged and took Scarborough Castle, which was seized by rebels in 1557. In reward he was granted the title of Earl of Northumberland and the Baronies of Percy, Poynings, Lucy, Bryan, and Fitzpane were restored to him, on 1 May 1557. He was installed at Whitehall with great pomp, and soon after was named Warden General of the Marches, in which capacity he fought and defeated the Scots.

Life under Elizabeth's Reign
On Queen Elizabeth I's accession the earl, whose loyalty to the Catholic Church was known, was kept in the North while the anti-Catholic measures of Elizabeth's first Parliament were passed. Elizabeth continued to show him favour, and in 1563 gave him the Order of the Garter. He had then resigned the wardenship and was living in the South. But the systematic persecution of the Catholics rendered their position most difficult, and in the autumn of 1569 the Catholic gentry in the North, stirred up by rumours of the approaching excommunication of Elizabeth, were planning to liberate Mary, Queen of Scots, possibly with a view putting her on the English throne, and to obtain liberty of worship. Earl Thomas with the Earl of Westmorland wrote to the pope asking for advice, but before their letter reached Rome circumstances hurried them into action against their better judgment.

Marriage and children

In 1558 he married Anne Somerset, daughter of Henry Somerset, 2nd Earl of Worcester. Their children included:
Thomas Percy, Baron Percy (died 1560), predeceased his father
Elizabeth Percy, wife of Richard Woodroffe of Woolley, son of Francis Woodroffe.
Joan Percy, wife of Lord Henry Seymour, a younger son of Edward Seymour, 1st Duke of Somerset by his wife Anne Stanhope.
Lucy Percy, wife of Edward Stanley of Tong Castle, the son of Sir Thomas Stanley by his wife Margaret Vernon
Mary Percy (11 June 15701643), a nun, founder of Benedictine Dames in Brussels from which nearly all the existing houses of Benedictine nuns in England are descended.

Death

Capture and beheading
After the Rising of the North failed, Thomas fled to Scotland, where he was captured by the Earl of Morton, one of the leading Scottish nobles. He was held at Lochleven Castle. Margaret Erskine wrote that her son, the Laird of Lochleven, was at Loch Leven, "and it is all frozyn, quha (who) is at greitt charges by resoun of grett company in his houss daylie for the keiping of my Lord of Northumberland".

After three years, the Earl was sold to the English Government for two thousand pounds. He was conducted to York and on 22 August 1572 was beheaded at a public execution on Pavement, refusing an offer to save his life by renouncing Catholicism. His headless body was buried at the now demolished St Crux Church, York.

Succession
His wife survived him, as did four daughters who were his co-heirs. The baronies of Percy and of Poynings and the earldom of Northumberland of the older creation were forfeited, but owing to a clause in the patent the newer earldom of Northumberland and the other honours conferred in 1557 were not. As his only son had predeceased him without male issue, the earldom passed to his younger brother Henry Percy, 8th Earl of Northumberland.

Beatification
He was beatified by Pope Leo XIII on 13 May 1895 and his festival was appointed to be observed in the Diocese of Hexham and Newcastle annually on 14 November.

References

External links
 Entry in Catholic.org

1528 births
1572 deaths
English beatified people
7
Knights of the Garter
Thomas Percy, 7th Earl of Northumberland
Executed English people
People executed under the Tudors for treason against England
16th-century venerated Christians
People executed by Tudor England by decapitation
People executed under Elizabeth I
English politicians convicted of crimes
English rebels
Nine Martyrs of England and Wales